Vergilov may refer to:

Anton Vergilov (born 1985), Bulgarian footballer
Vergilov Rocks, rock formation in Antarctica